Thomas Barton ( – ) was an English professional rugby league footballer who played in the 1900s.

Playing career

International honours
Tom Barton won a cap for England while at St. Helens in 1906 against Other Nationalities.

Challenge Cup Final appearances
Tom Barton played , i.e. number 2, in St. Helens' 3–37 defeat by Huddersfield in the 1915 Challenge Cup Final during the 1914–15 season at Watersheddings, Oldham on Saturday 1 May 1915, in front of a crowd of 8,000.

Club career
Tom Barton was considered a "Probable" for the 1910 Great Britain Lions tour of Australia and New Zealand, but ultimately he was not selected for the tour.

Genealogical information
Tom Barton was the younger brother of the rugby league  who played in the 1890s for St. Helens, and Castleford; Jack Barton.

References

External links
Profile at saints.org.uk

1883 births
1958 deaths
England national rugby league team players
English rugby league players
Place of birth missing
Place of death missing
Rugby league centres
Rugby league fullbacks
Rugby league forwards
Rugby league utility players
Rugby league wingers
St Helens R.F.C. captains
St Helens R.F.C. players